Rendez-vous is the debut extended play by South Korean Im Hyun-sik of BtoB. The album was released on October 14, 2019 by Cube Entertainment under U-CUBE and Kakao M distribution.

The song was released through several music portals, including MelOn, iTunes, and Spotify.

On January 31, 2020, a live album of Rendez-vous was released.

Background 
The main theme of the album is space. In particular about the encounters and connections in the outer space.   The album contains a total of six songs, including the title song Dear Love and its instrumental version, Rendez-vous, Docking, Black and Moonlight.

Music structure 
Rendez-vous album would tell a diverse stories about universe across alternative, rock and synth-pop genre. The title track Dear Love genre is alternative that harmonizes Im's soft voice and guitar with poetic lyrics.

Release
Cube Entertainment released a spoiler image for Im's first solo album, on September 22. The image reveals a person wearing a space suit raising his finger toward the universe. In particular, the English name of Im Hyun-sik, along with the code number "RD-V1102-3". The release of the record was first announced on September 24, 2019. Starting October 4 to 6, Cube Entertainment released a series of teasers to promote Rendez-vous. The following day, a highlight medley for the record were released. On October 9 and 10, two music video trailer for "Dear Love" was released. First, it contained Im screaming of approaching objects faced in outer space, and the second showed the first moment that Im encounters an unidentified person who is similarly dressed in outer space.

Promotion
Im held his first sold out solo concert RENDEZ-VOUS at Bluesquare iMarket Hall on November 2 and 3, 2019.

Track listing

Personnel 
Personnel adapted from the liner notes of the physical album.

 Im Hyun-sik – all vocals; writer ; producer ; chorus ; Guitar ; brass ; drum ; Computer Programming ; synthesizer 
 MosPick – producer 
 Ferdy – guitar 
 Seon Young-jin – E.P 
 CUBE Trainee – special chorus 
 Jukjae – guitar

Charts

Release history

References 

2019 EPs
Cube Entertainment EPs
Korean-language EPs